A primate city is a city that is the largest in its country, province, state, or region, and disproportionately larger than any others in the urban hierarchy. A primate city distribution is a rank-size distribution that has one very large city with many much smaller cities and towns, and no intermediate-sized urban centers: a king effect, visible as an outlier on an otherwise linear graph, when the rest of the data fit a power law or stretched exponential function. 

The law of the primate city was first proposed by the geographer Mark Jefferson in 1939. He defines a primate city as being "at least twice as large as the next largest city and more than twice as significant." Aside from size and population, a primate city will usually have precedence in all other aspects of its country's society such as economics, politics, culture, and education. Primate cities also serve as targets for the majority of a country or region's internal migration.

In geography, the phenomenon of excessive concentration of population and development of the main city of a country or a region (often to the detriment of other areas) is called urban primacy or urban macrocephaly.

Measurement 
Urban primacy can be measured as the share of a country's population that lives in the primate city. Relative primacy indicates the ratio of the primate city's population to that of the second largest in a country or region.

Significance 
Not all countries have primate cities. In those that do, there is debate as to whether the city serves a parasitic or generative function. The presence of a primate city in a country may indicate an imbalance in development—usually a progressive core and a lagging periphery—on which the city depends for labor and other resources. However, the urban structure is not directly dependent on a country's level of economic development.

Many primate cities gain an increasing share of their country's population. This can be due to a reduction in blue-collar population in the hinterlands because of mechanization and automation.  Simultaneously, the number of educated employees in white-collar endeavors such as politics, finance, media, and higher education rises. These sectors are clustered predominantly in primate cities where power and wealth are concentrated.

Examples 

Some global cities are considered national or regional primate cities. An example of a global city that is as a primate city is Istanbul in Turkey. Istanbul serves as the primate city of Turkey due to the unmatched economic, political, cultural, and educational influence that the city possesses in comparison to other Turkish cities such as the capital Ankara, İzmir, or Bursa. Another example is London in the United Kingdom. However, not all regions or countries will even possess a primate city. The United States has never had a primate city on a national level due to the decentralized nature of the country, and because the second-largest city of the country, Los Angeles, is not far behind the largest city in the country, New York City, in population and GDP. The metropolitan area of New York City has 21 million residents and Los Angeles has 16 million residents. Mexico City, Paris, Cairo, Jakarta, and Seoul have been described as primate cities in their respective countries. 

Sub-national divisions can also have primate cities. For instance, New York City is New York State's primate city because its population is 32 times bigger than the state's second-largest city of Buffalo. New York City has 44% of the population and has 65% of the GDP of New York State. China does not have a primate city at a national level, but a number of provincial capitals are disproportionately larger than other urban areas in the respective province. For example Henan, Hubei and Sichuan have provincial capitals (Zhengzhou, Wuhan, and Chengdu respectively) that are significantly larger than the second-largest city despite these provinces having the population of a large European country. India does not have a primate city, as Delhi's population is not much greater than Mumbai and Kolkata behind it. However, many Indian states, such as Karnataka, West Bengal or Tamil Nadu have primate cities, Bangalore, Chennai, and Kolkata, respectively. Other Indian states such as Uttar Pradesh or Kerala do not have any primate cities. 

Bangkok, the capital of Thailand, has been called "the most primate city on Earth" when it was 40 times larger than the second-largest city of that time, Nakhon Ratchasima, in the year 2000. As of 2022, Bangkok is nearly nine times larger than Thailand's current second-largest city of Chiang Mai. Taking the concept from his examination of the primate city during the 2010 Thai political protests and applying it to the role that primate cities play if they are national capitals, researcher Jack Fong noted that when primate cities like Bangkok function as national capitals, they are inherently vulnerable to insurrection by the military and the dispossessed. He cites the fact that most primate cities serving as national capitals contain major headquarters for the country. Thus, logistically, it is rather "efficient" for national targets to be contested since they are all in one major urban environment.

The metropolitan area of the city of Moscow, the capital of Russia, is almost four times the size of the metropolitan area of the next largest city, Saint Petersburg, and plays a unique and uncontested role of the cultural and political center of the country. It can therefore be considered a primate city.

Primate cities need not be capital cities: governments may attempt to establish a new planned capital city to challenge the primacy of the largest city and provide more balanced growth, for example in Tanzania, Dar es Salaam can still be considered a primate city although the capital was moved to Dodoma in 1996. A non-capital primate city may also emerge organically: for example, the existing city of Wellington was chosen to be New Zealand's capital in 1865, although Auckland commands a greater share of the population and economy.

List

Africa

Asia 

For the Philippines, figures are for Metro Manila and Metro Cebu. Manila is the national capital, which is within Metro Manila, a region. Meanwhile, Cebu City is the capital city of the province of Cebu, with Metro Cebu being its main urban center. Metro Manila is within Mega Manila, the megapolis that has a population of around 25 million.

Europe

North America & Central America

 
Although Belize does not have a primate city, Belize City is more than twice the size of San Ignacio, the country's second-largest city/urban area. It is also the cultural and economic centre of Belize. The capital is Belmopan, third-largest in the country.

Oceania

Australia does not have a primate city, but at the state level, each of the capital cities of the states and territories act as the primate city of that state or territory.

South America

See also 
 Capital city
Primate (disambiguation) 
 Global city
 Megacity
 Metropolis
 Rank–size distribution
 Secondary city

Notes

References 

Cities by type
Geography-related lists
Urban studies and planning terminology